Hyperemesis gravidarum (HG) is a pregnancy complication that is characterized by severe nausea, vomiting, weight loss, and possibly dehydration. Feeling faint may also occur. It is considered more severe than morning sickness. Symptoms often get better after the 20th week of pregnancy but may last the entire pregnancy duration.

The exact causes of hyperemesis gravidarum are unknown. Risk factors include the first pregnancy, multiple pregnancy, obesity, prior or family history of HG, trophoblastic disorder, and a history of eating disorders. Diagnosis is usually made based on the observed signs and symptoms. HG has been technically defined as more than three episodes of vomiting per day such that weight loss of 5% or three kilograms has occurred and ketones are present in the urine. Other potential causes of the symptoms should be excluded, including urinary tract infection and an overactive thyroid.

Treatment includes drinking fluids and a bland diet. Recommendations may include electrolyte-replacement drinks, thiamine, and a higher protein diet. Some people require intravenous fluids. With respect to medications, pyridoxine or metoclopramide are preferred. Prochlorperazine, dimenhydrinate, ondansetron (sold under the brand-name Zofran) or corticosteroids may be used if these are not effective. Hospitalization may be required due to the severe symptoms associated. Psychotherapy may improve outcomes. Evidence for acupressure is poor.

While vomiting in pregnancy has been described as early as 2,000 BC, the first clear medical description of HG was in 1852 by Paul Antoine Dubois. HG is estimated to affect 0.3–2.0% of pregnant women, although some sources say the figure can be as high as 3%. While previously known as a common cause of death in pregnancy, with proper treatment this is now very rare. Those affected have a lower risk of miscarriage but a higher risk of premature birth. Some pregnant women choose to have an abortion due to HG symptoms.

Signs and symptoms
When vomiting is severe, it may result in the following:
 Loss of 5% or more of pre-pregnancy body weight
 Dehydration, causing ketosis, and constipation
 Nutritional disorders, such as vitamin B1 (thiamine) deficiency, vitamin B6 (pyridoxine) deficiency or vitamin B12 (cobalamin) deficiency
 Metabolic imbalances such as metabolic ketoacidosis or thyrotoxicosis
 Physical and emotional stress
 Difficulty with activities of daily living

Symptoms can be aggravated by hunger, fatigue, prenatal vitamins (especially those containing iron), and diet. Many women with HG are extremely sensitive to odors in their environment; certain smells may exacerbate symptoms. Excessive salivation, also known as sialorrhea gravidarum, is another symptom experienced by some women.

Hyperemesis gravidarum tends to occur in the first trimester of pregnancy and lasts significantly longer than morning sickness. While most women will experience near-complete relief of morning sickness symptoms near the beginning of their second trimester, some people with HG will experience severe symptoms until they give birth to their baby, and sometimes even after giving birth.

A small percentage rarely vomit, but the nausea still causes most (if not all) of the same issues that hyperemesis with vomiting does.

Causes
There are numerous theories regarding the cause of HG, but the cause remains controversial. It is thought that HG is due to a combination of factors which may vary between women and include genetics. Women with family members who had HG are more likely to develop the disease.

One factor is an adverse reaction to the hormonal changes of pregnancy, in particular, elevated levels of beta human chorionic gonadotropin (β-hCG). This theory would also explain why hyperemesis gravidarum is most frequently encountered in the first trimester (often around 8–12 weeks of gestation), as β-hCG levels are highest at that time and decline afterward. Another postulated cause of HG is an increase in maternal levels of estrogens (decreasing intestinal motility and gastric emptying leading to nausea/vomiting).

More recently, another cause of HG was discovered: "Evidence suggests abnormal levels of the hormone GDF15 are associated with HG. The validation of a second risk variant, rs1054221, provides further support for GDF15's role in the etiology of HG. Additionally, maternal genes appear to play a more significant role than paternal DNA in contributing to the severity of NVP."

Pathophysiology

Although the pathophysiology of HG is poorly understood, the most commonly accepted theory suggests that levels of β-hCG are associated with it. Leptin, a hormone that inhibits hunger, may also play a role.

Possible pathophysiological processes involved are summarized in the following table:

Diagnosis
Hyperemesis gravidarum is considered a diagnosis of exclusion. HG can be associated with serious problems in the mother or baby, such as Wernicke's encephalopathy, coagulopathy and peripheral neuropathy.

Women experiencing hyperemesis gravidarum often are dehydrated and lose weight despite efforts to eat. The onset of the nausea and vomiting in hyperemesis gravidarum is typically before the 20th week of pregnancy.

Differential diagnosis
Diagnoses to be ruled out include the following:

Investigations
Common investigations include blood urea nitrogen (BUN) and electrolytes, liver function tests, urinalysis, and thyroid function tests. Hematological investigations include hematocrit levels, which are usually raised in HG. An ultrasound scan may be needed to know gestational status and to exclude molar or partial molar pregnancy.

Management
Dry bland food and oral rehydration are first-line treatments. Due to the potential for severe dehydration and other complications, HG is treated as an emergency. If conservative dietary measures fail, more extensive treatment such as the use of antiemetic medications and intravenous rehydration may be required. If oral nutrition is insufficient, intravenous nutritional support may be needed. For women who require hospital admission, thromboembolic stockings or low-molecular-weight heparin may be used as measures to prevent the formation of a blood clot.

Intravenous fluids
Intravenous (IV) hydration often includes supplementation of electrolytes as persistent vomiting frequently leads to a deficiency. Likewise, supplementation for lost thiamine (Vitamin B1) must be considered to reduce the risk of Wernicke's encephalopathy. A and B vitamins are depleted within two weeks, so extended malnutrition indicates a need for evaluation and supplementation. In addition, electrolyte levels should be monitored and supplemented; of particular concern are sodium and potassium.

After IV rehydration is completed, patients typically begin to tolerate frequent small liquid or bland meals. After rehydration, treatment focuses on managing symptoms to allow normal intake of food. However, cycles of hydration and dehydration can occur, making continuing care necessary. Home care is available in the form of a peripherally inserted central catheter (PICC) line for hydration and nutrition.  Home treatment is often less expensive and reduces the risk for a hospital-acquired infection compared with long-term or repeated hospitalizations.

Medications
A number of antiemetics are effective and safe in pregnancy including: pyridoxine/doxylamine, antihistamines (such as diphenhydramine), and phenothiazines (such as promethazine). With respect to effectiveness, it is unknown if one is superior to another for relieving nausea or vomiting. Limited evidence from published clinical trials suggests the use of medications to treat hyperemesis gravidarum.

While pyridoxine/doxylamine, a combination of vitamin B6 and doxylamine, is effective in nausea and vomiting of pregnancy, some have questioned its effectiveness in HG.

Ondansetron may be beneficial, however, there are some concerns regarding an association with cleft palate, and there is little high-quality data. Metoclopramide is also used and relatively well tolerated. Evidence for the use of corticosteroids is weak; there is some evidence that corticosteroid use in pregnant women may slightly increase the risk of cleft lip and cleft palate in the infant and may suppress fetal adrenal activity. However, hydrocortisone and prednisolone are inactivated in the placenta and may be used in the treatment of hyperemesis gravidarum after 12 weeks.

Medicinal cannabis has been used to treat pregnancy-associated hyperemesis.

Nutritional support
Women not responding to IV rehydration and medication may require nutritional support. Patients might receive parenteral nutrition (intravenous feeding via a PICC line) or enteral nutrition (via a nasogastric tube or a nasojejunal tube). There is only limited evidence from trials to support the use of vitamin B6 to improve outcome. An oversupply of nutrition (hyperalimentation) may be necessary in certain cases to help maintain volume requirements and allow weight gain. A physician might also prescribe Vitamin B1 (to prevent Wernicke's encephalopathy) and folic acid.

Alternative medicine
Acupuncture (both with P6 and traditional method) has been found to be ineffective. The use of ginger products may be helpful, but evidence of effectiveness is limited and inconsistent, though three recent studies support ginger over placebo.

Complications

Pregnant woman
If HG is inadequately treated, anemia, hyponatremia, Wernicke's encephalopathy, kidney failure, central pontine myelinolysis, coagulopathy, atrophy, Mallory-Weiss tears, hypoglycemia, jaundice, malnutrition, pneumomediastinum, rhabdomyolysis, deconditioning, deep vein thrombosis, pulmonary embolism, splenic avulsion, or vasospasms of cerebral arteries are possible consequences. Depression and post-traumatic stress disorder are common secondary complications of HG and emotional support can be beneficial.

Infant
The effects of HG on the fetus are mainly due to electrolyte imbalances caused by HG in the mother. Infants of women with severe hyperemesis who gain less than  during pregnancy tend to be of lower birth weight, small for gestational age, and born before 37 weeks gestation. In contrast, infants of women with hyperemesis who have a pregnancy weight gain of more than 7 kilograms appear similar to infants from uncomplicated pregnancies. There is no significant difference in the neonatal death rate in infants born to mothers with HG compared to infants born to mothers who do not have HG. Children born to mothers with undertreated HG have a fourfold increase in neurobehavioral diagnoses.

Epidemiology
Vomiting is a common condition affecting about 50% of pregnant women, with another 25% having nausea. However, the incidence of HG is only 0.3–1.5%. After preterm labor, hyperemesis gravidarum is the second most common reason for hospital admission during the first half of pregnancy. Factors such as infection with Helicobacter pylori, a rise in thyroid hormone production, low age, low body mass index prior to pregnancy, multiple pregnancies, molar pregnancies, and a history of hyperemesis gravidarum have been associated with the development of HG.

History
Thalidomide was prescribed for treatment of HG in Europe until it was recognized that thalidomide is teratogenic and is a cause of phocomelia in neonates.

Etymology
Hyperemesis gravidarum is from the Greek hyper-, meaning excessive, and emesis, meaning vomiting, and the Latin gravidarum, the feminine genitive plural form of an adjective, here used as a noun, meaning "pregnant [woman]". Therefore, hyperemesis gravidarum means "excessive vomiting of pregnant women".

Notable cases
Author Charlotte Brontë is often thought to have had hyperemesis gravidarum. She died in 1855 while four months pregnant, having been affected by intractable nausea and vomiting throughout her pregnancy, and was unable to tolerate food or even water.

Catherine, Princess of Wales was hospitalised due to hyperemesis gravidarum during her first pregnancy, and was treated for a similar condition during the subsequent two.

Comedienne Amy Schumer cancelled the remainder of a tour due to hyperemesis gravidarum.

References

External links 

Health issues in pregnancy
Vomiting
Wikipedia medicine articles ready to translate
Women's health